Moving Story is a British comedy drama television series which aired on ITV in two series between 26 May 1994 and 29 August 1995. It was created by Jack Rosenthal as a spin-off from his 1984 film The Chain, about a group of removal men.

Actors who appeared in episodes of the series include Peter Blythe, Zena Walker, Dora Bryan, Caroline Catz, Martin Clunes, Gwen Taylor, Ben Walden, Bryan Pringle, Miles Anderson, Jeffry Wickham, Pauline Jameson, Benjamin Whitrow, Sarah-Jane Potts, Doreen Keogh, Pauline Delaney, Mark Benton, Vincent Regan, David Ryall, Shay Gorman, Jonathan Coy, Beth Goddard and Camille Coduri.

Main cast
 Warren Clarke as  Bamber
 Phil Davis as Adrenalin
 Con O'Neill as  Nick
 Ronny Jhutti as Asif
 Kenneth Colley as Ken Uttley
 Sheila Kelley as Patsy
 Melanie Kilburn as Charlotte
 Emma Amos as Kathy
 Meera Devon as  Kalsoom

Episodes

Series One

"Moving Story" (26 May 1994 – 75 minutes)
"Last Stand at Laurel Way" (2 June 1994 – brought forward from 9 June 1994)
"A Piece of Cake" (9 June 1994 – postponed from 2 June 1994)
"Father's Day" (16 June 1994)
"Charlotte, Emma, Bamber & Anne" (30 June 1994)
"None Shall Sleep" (7 July 1994)

Series Two

"The African Queen" (18 July 1995)
"Norman Blood" (25 July 1995)
"Bear Necessities" (1 August 1995)
"Something Blue" (8 August 1995)
"Trivial Pursuits" (15 August 1995)
"Superstition" (22 August 1995)
"Canterbury Tales" (29 August 1995)

References

2. Theme tune for Moving Story by Kirsty Maccoll “Moving Out” (unreleased)

Bibliography
 Howard Maxford. Hammer Complete: The Films, the Personnel, the Company. McFarland, 2018.

External links
 

1994 British television series debuts
1995 British television series endings
1990s British comedy-drama television series
ITV television dramas
Television series by ITV Studios
Carlton Television
English-language television shows
Television shows set in London